Benzin is a 2017 Bulgarian action film directed by Katerina Goranova and Asen Blatechki.

Plot 
After 15 years in prison a talented racing driver and mechanic returns to life to fulfill his last promise to his dead beloved - to bring back Luce, the car bearing her name, and to dispense justice.

Cast 
 Asen Blatechki as Dim
 Snejana Makaveeva as Nicole
 :bg:Калин Врачански as Little Rado
 Bashar Rahal as Karim
 Sully Erna as Hitchhiker

References

External links 
 

Bulgarian thriller films
2017 films
2017 action thriller films
2010s chase films
2010s romance films